Giovanni Treccani  (3 January 1877 – 6 July 1961) was an Italian textile industrialist, publisher and cultural patron. He sponsored the Giovanni Treccani Institute, established 18 February 1925 to publish the Enciclopedia Italiana (currently best known with his own name, Enciclopedia Treccani).

Treccani was the son of a pharmacist. At the age of 17, he emigrated to Germany to work as a textile worker. In 1924, he became a Senator of Italy. In 1925 work started on the Italian Encyclopedia Institute. In 1937 he was awarded the title of Count, and in 1939 received a degree honoris causa in literature from the University of Milan.

References

1877 births
1961 deaths
Italian businesspeople
Members of the Senate of the Kingdom of Italy
Businesspeople in textiles
People from the Province of Brescia
Italian encyclopedists